427 Special Operations Aviation Squadron (427 SOAS) is a tactical helicopter unit that provides aviation support to Canadian Special Operations Forces Command. The squadron is based at CFB Petawawa, Ontario with a fleet of Bell CH-146 Griffon helicopters. It was founded during the Second World War as No. 427 Squadron RCAF.

History 

427 Squadron started as a bomber squadron formed at Croft, England on 7 November 1942 and spent its wartime entirely in England as a part of No. 6 Group RCAF, RAF Bomber Command. 427 flew Vickers Wellington Mk IIIs and Mk Xs from its first operational mission on 14 December 1942, a minelaying sortie to the Frisian Islands, until May 1943 when it was relocated to Leeming, North Yorkshire. Re-equipped with Handley Page Halifax Mk V aircraft, the squadron flew intensely until early 1944 when it replaced its inventory with Halifax Mk III aircraft. This fleet saw the greatest number of missions and in slightly more than a year's time they were then replaced by Avro Lancaster bombers prior to the end of World War II. The Lancasters were used for prisoner of war repatriation until the end of May 1946. 427 was stood down on 1 June 1946.

The squadron was reformed on 1 August 1952 at RCAF Station St. Hubert (a suburb of modern-day Montreal, Quebec, Canada) as 427 Fighter Squadron, flying Canadair Sabres, and was transferred to No. 3 (Fighter) Wing at Zweibrücken in March 1953. Selected as the first European RCAF squadron to receive the Canadair CF-104 Starfighter for the nuclear strike role, the squadron was stood down from its day-fighter role on 15 December 1962 and reformed as 427 (Strike-Attack) Squadron two days later.

On 1 February 1968, unification integrated 427 into the new Canadian Forces. The squadron was again disbanded on 1 July 1970.

427 came back into existence as 427 Tactical Helicopter Squadron at CFB Petawawa, where it remains today.

The squadron has also taken an active role in humanitarian efforts such as the January 1998 ice storm in eastern Canada, where the squadron deployed eight aircraft to Ottawa and Kingston, and the November 1998 mission to help the victims of Hurricane Mitch. With only 24 hours' notice, four 427 Squadron Bell CH-146 Griffons deployed to La Ceiba, Honduras. Once in the country, Griffon crews airlifted medical teams into communities cut off by the hurricane. For the next six weeks, the squadron ferried supplies and aid workers to many isolated towns and villages.

On 1 February 2006, command of 427 was transferred to Canadian Special Operations Forces Command, as it took on a full-time role of special operations aviation support. Shortly thereafter, it was renamed 427 Special Operations Aviation Squadron (427 SOAS). Qualified tactical aviators selected by 427 SOAS must complete SOTAC (Special Operation Tactical Aviation Course), which runs for approximately four months.

Aircraft flown by 427 Squadron

Historic aircraft
 Vickers Wellington Mk.III (November 1942 – March 1943)
 Vickers Wellington Mk.X (February 1942 – May 1943)
 Handley Page Halifax Mk.V (May 1943 – February 1944)
 Handley Page Halifax Mk.III (January 1944 – March 1945)
 Avro Lancaster Mk.I/III (March 1945 – May 1946)
 Canadair Sabre Mk.2 (September 1952 – June 1953)
 Canadair Sabre Mk.5 (May 1953 – September 1955)
 Canadair Sabre Mk.6 (September 1955 – December 1962)
 Canadair CF-104 Starfighter (December 1962 – 1970)
 Cessna L-19 Bird Dog (January 1971 – )
 Bell CH-135 Twin Huey (1992 – July 1997)
 Bell CH-136 Kiowa
 Mil CH-178 (2010 – 2011)

Current aircraft
 Bell CH-146 Griffon (December 1996 – current)

Battle honours

Battle honours in small capitals are for large operations and campaigns and those in lowercase are for more specific battles. 427 Squadron was awarded the following battle honours, which are carried on their standard:

See also 

 Canadian Armed Forces
 Canadian Special Operations Regiment
 Joint Task Force 2
 List of Royal Canadian Air Force squadrons

Similar units in other armed forces
 4th Special Forces Helicopter Regiment (French)
 3rd Special Operations Helicopter Regiment "Aldebaran" (Italian)
 160th Special Operations Aviation Regiment (Airborne) (US)
 171st Aviation Squadron (Australia)
 Joint Special Forces Aviation Wing (British)

References

Notes

Citations

Bibliography

External links

Canadian Forces aircraft squadrons
Helicopter units and formations
Canadian Special Operations Force Command